The 15th World Scout Jamboree was scheduled to be held 15–23 July 1979 and was to be hosted by Iran at Nishapur, but was cancelled due to the Iranian Revolution which took place in 1979.

The 15th World Jamboree was to be held at the 10 square kilometre Omar Khayyám Scout Park (Baghrud Scout Park) in the city of Nishapur. The Second Asia-Pacific Jamboree was held at the site in preparation, in the summer of 1977. 

However, the destabilizing events of the Islamic Revolution caused the 15th World Jamboree to be cancelled near the end of 1978. Instead, the World Organization of the Scout Movement announced the "World Jamboree Year" by holding several international World Jamboree Year camps in Australia, Canada, Sweden, Switzerland and the United States that took up the momentum. However, a number of commemorative items had already been made for the event, the demand for which and the value of which was greatly inflated by the Jamboree's cancellation. The few items of memorabilia in existence are of huge value to collectors when they, albeit rarely, come on the market.

The next Jamboree, hosted by Canada in 1983, was named The Spirit Lives On to show how Scouting's spirit of international brotherhood could overcome the setback of cancelling the 1979 Jamboree.

See also
Iranian Scouting Organization
15th World Scout Jamboree

External links
Jamboree Histories at ScoutBase
Jamboree Histories at Scout.org
Boys' Life

1979
Scouting in Iran
History of Nishapur
Cancelled events